Isobucaine is a local anesthetic.

Synthesis

The reductive amination between aminomethyl propanol  (1) and isobutanal [78-84-2] (2) afforded N-Isobutyl-1,1-dimethyl-2-hydroxyethanamine, CID:18315986 (3). Acylation of the amine with benzoyl chloride [98-88-4] hypothetically goes initially to the amide (4'). The acid catalysis used in the reaction leads to an N to O acyl migration to afford isobucaine (5).

See also
List of local anesthetics

References

Local anesthetics
Benzoate esters